Afroneta praticola is a species of sheet weaver (a family of very small spiders) found in Tanzania. It was described by Holm in 1968.

References

Endemic fauna of Tanzania
Linyphiidae
Fauna of Tanzania
Spiders of Africa
Spiders described in 1968